Sam Doyle (1906–1985) was a Gullah folk artist.

Sam or Samuel Doyle may also refer to:

Sam Doyle (musician), drummer with The Maccabees 
Sam Doyle, character in Flight Lieutenant
Samuel Doyle (politician) for 74th New York State Legislature